Dia Nacional de Galicia ("National Day of Galicia") is when the autonomous community of Galicia in Spain celebrates its national holiday. It falls on 25 July. 

It is also called Día da Patria Galega ("Day of the Galician Fatherland"), or simply Día de Galicia ("Galicia Day"), but the official full denomination is the "National Day of Galicia", as established by the Galician government in 1979.

History of the celebration
The origins of the celebration can be traced back to 1919, when the Assembly of the Galicianist organization Irmandades da Fala met in the Galician capital, Santiago de Compostela. It was then decided to celebrate the National Day on 25 July the following year. The date was chosen as it is the day dedicated to Saint James, patron saint of both Galicia and the Galician capital city.

It was celebrated openly until the Francoist dictatorship (1939-1977), when any display of non-Spanish nationalism was prohibited. During that time the National Day would still be celebrated as such by the Galician emigrant communities abroad. In Galicia, the Galicianists would gather with the pretext of offering a Mass for Galician poet and literary icon Rosalia de Castro. Curiously enough, the Francoist regime institutionalized the religious celebration of Saint James as the "patron saint of Spain".

Nonetheless, from 1968 Galicianists attempted to celebrate the day in Compostela, still during the dictatorship. The Partido Socialista de Galicia ("Galician Socialist Party") and the Unión do Povo Galego ("Galician People's Union") called for public political demonstrations every 25 July. These demonstrations would invariably result in riots with the Spanish police. Even during the first years of democracy, after 1977, any demonstration organised by the Asemblea Nacional-Popular Galega and the BN-PG (later transformed into the Galician Nationalist Bloc) would still be forbidden. It is only during the mid-1980s when the National Day started to, gradually, be celebrated with some degree of normality. Although, the events from the late 1960s onwards transformed the National Day celebrations into a date with deep political implications. At present, Galician political parties (mostly nationalist, but not only) organise large demonstrations at the capital city and/or a number of activities to commemorate the day. 

The political and institutional activities are normally all based in Santiago de Compostela, and the day is an official public holiday celebrated with solemnity by the Galician government. Apart from that, a number of festivities take place from the night of the 24th until high hours in the morning of the 26th, celebrated by many.

The 2013 festivities were cancelled due to a fatal rail accident in Santiago the previous day.

Notes

See also
Galician People
History of Galicia
Timeline of Galician history
Galician nationalism
Irmandades da Fala

External links 

A history of the Día Nacional de Galicia (in Galician)

National holidays
Galician culture
July observances
History of Galicia (Spain)
Public holidays in Spain
Summer events in Spain
Annual events in Galicia (Spain)